Carthage Historic District is a national historic district located at Carthage, Moore County, North Carolina. The district encompasses 85 contributing buildings, 1 contributing site, 5 contributing structures, and 1 contributing object in a predominantly residential section of Carthage.  It was developed between the 1850s and 1940 and includes notable examples of Queen Anne, Greek Revival, and Colonial Revival style architecture.  Notable buildings include the Carthage Methodist Church (1898-1900), (former) Carthage Community House (1939-1940) built by the National Youth Administration, the "Chub" Seawell House, Edgehill, Charles Sinclair House, Dr. John Shaw House, Humber-Spencer House, Adams-Bryan House, Jenkins House, Harley-Muse House (1879), George Calvin Graves House (1882, 1897), W. T. Jones House (1897), the J. F. Cole House (1899), the Methodist Parsonage (1922), and Presbyterian Manse.

It was added to the National Register of Historic Places in 1992.

References

Historic districts on the National Register of Historic Places in North Carolina
Greek Revival architecture in North Carolina
Queen Anne architecture in North Carolina
Colonial Revival architecture in North Carolina
Buildings and structures in Moore County, North Carolina
National Register of Historic Places in Moore County, North Carolina